Malalai Joya (born 25 April 1978) is an activist, writer, and a politician from Afghanistan. She served as a Parliamentarian in the National Assembly of Afghanistan from 2005 until early 2007, after being dismissed for publicly denouncing the presence of warlords and war criminals in the Afghan Parliament. She was an outspoken critic of the Karzai administration and its western supporters, particularly the United States.

Her suspension in May 2007 generated protest internationally and appeals for her reinstatement were signed by high-profile writers, intellectuals such as Noam Chomsky, and politicians including members of parliament from Canada, Germany, the United Kingdom, Italy, and Spain. She was called "the bravest woman in Afghanistan" by the BBC.

In 2010, Time magazine placed Malalai Joya on their annual list of the 100 most influential people in the world. Foreign Policy Magazine listed Malalai Joya in its annual list of the Top 100 Global Thinkers. On 8 March 2011, The Guardian listed her among "Top 100 women: activists and campaigners".

Early and personal life
Joya was born on 25 April 1978, in the Farah Province, in western Afghanistan. Her father was a former medical student who lost a leg while fighting in the Soviet–Afghan War. In 1982, when she was 4 years old, her family fled Afghanistan to live as refugees in neighboring Iran. She got involved in humanitarian work while in eighth grade.

Joya returned to Afghanistan in 1998, during the Taliban's reign. As a young woman she worked as a social activist and was named a director of the non-governmental group, in the western provinces of Herat and Farah. She is married, but has not revealed the name of her husband due to fear for his safety.

Speech at the 2003 loya jirga
Malalai Joya gained international attention when, as an elected delegate to the Loya Jirga convened to ratify the Constitution of Afghanistan, she spoke out publicly against the domination of warlords on 17 December 2003.

Some delegates applauded her speech, but others turned to shock and dissatisfaction, including the chief of the Loya Jirga, Sibghatullah Mojaddedi who called her "infidel" and "communist", and ordered her out of the assembly. Some delegates were heard shouting death threats. After some representatives intervened her expulsion, Joya returned to the assembly, but refused to apologize after being asked by Mojadeddi.

World Pulse Magazine (issue 1, 2005) wrote:

Political appointments and speaking engagements
Joya was elected to the 249-seat National Assembly, or Wolesi Jirga in September 2005, as a representative of Farah Province, winning the second highest number of votes in the province, with 7.3 percent of the vote. At an impromptu news conference after the swearing-in ceremony in December 2005, she offered her "condolences" to the people of Afghanistan "for the presence of warlords, drug lords and criminals" in the Parliament. "The people of Afghanistan have recently escaped the Taliban cage but still they are trapped in the cage of those who are called warlords"

She has continued her stance against the inclusion of alleged war criminals in the Islamic Republic government of Afghanistan.

The BBC has called Joya "the most famous woman in Afghanistan." In a 27 January 2007 interview with BBC News Joya commented on her personal political mission amid continuous death threats, saying:

"They will kill me but they will not kill my voice, because it will be the voice of all Afghan women. You can cut the flower, but you cannot stop the coming of spring."

In 2006, The Washington Post said of Joya: "Her truth is that warlords should not be permitted to hide behind 'the mask of democracy to hold on to their chairs' and their pernicious pursuits at the expense of poor, 'barefoot' Afghans who remain voiceless and disillusioned. The warlords are corrupt 'war criminals' who should be tried, and incorrigible 'drug dealers' who brought the country to its knees, she said."

Malalai Joya appeared at the Federal Convention of Canada's New Democratic Party (NDP) in Quebec City on 10 September 2006, supporting party leader Jack Layton and the NDP's criticism of the NATO-led mission in southern Afghanistan. She said, "No nation can donate liberation to another nation."

On 13 September she addressed gatherings at McGill University in Montreal and at the University of Ottawa, where she expressed her disappointment with US actions in Afghanistan.

After her speech, Prof. Denis Rancourt of the University of Ottawa, wrote in an article about Joya: "Her talk was a sharp blade cutting thru the thick web of US-Canada war propaganda... All MPs need to take a lesson from Malalai Joya.",

Malalai was in Sydney, on 8 March 2007, as a guest of UNIFEM, speaking about women's rights in Afghanistan in honor of International Women's Day.

Malalai returned to Canada in November 2007 and addressed 400 people at the Steelworkers Hall on Cecil Street in Toronto. She then addressed a small group of union activists and activists at the Ontario Federation of Labour.

In November 2008 Malalai visited the Norway Social Forum, and spoke before the 1900 participants. She also participated in a debate with the Norwegian Foreign Minister, and asked Norway to pull its troops out of Afghanistan.

In December 2008, Malalai Joya was invited by Amnesty International India to New Delhi for the International Week of Justice Festival, 5–10 December 2008, commemorating the 60th anniversary of the Universal Declaration of Human Rights. Joya participated in two public forums for the festival at Jamia Millia Islamia and Alliance Francaise on the issues related to post-war Afghanistan, female empowerment and torture.

Spain's popular 20 Minutos newspaper in its list of "The world's most beautiful female politicians", puts Malalai Joya in the 54th place, getting 1053 votes from its readers for her.

In October–November 2009 Joya was on book tour to the US and Canada and addressed many anti-war rallies and gatherings. She called for withdrawal of all troops from Afghanistan.

When Obama was awarded the 2009 Nobel Peace Prize, Noam Chomsky wrote in an article syndicated by The New York Times: "The Nobel Peace Prize committee might well have made truly worthy choices, prominent among them the remarkable Afghan activist Malalai Joya."

On 24 November 2009, New Statesman (UK) ranked Malalai Joya in the sixth place on its list of "The 50 people who matter today... for good and ill", calling her "Afghanistan's answer to Aung San Suu Kyi."

Because she is "unemployed" and "lives underground", the United States denied Joya a travel visa in March 2011 which sparked a public campaign by her supporters to pressure the US government. She was scheduled to speak at several different places in the United States, including Pace University in Manhattan and St. Mary's College of Maryland. Joya stated that "[the Afghan government] has probably requested the U.S. to not let me enter ... because I am exposing the wrong policies of the U.S. and its puppet regime at the international level." However, the U.S. State Department later explained that a visa has been issued to Joya.

Joya started her US speaking tour on 25 March 2011 from Boston where, along with Professor Noam Chomsky, she gave a presentation on the Afghan war to 1200 people at Harvard's Memorial Church.

Parliament statements, attack and suspension
On 7 May 2006, Malalai Joya was physically and verbally attacked by fellow members of parliament after accusing several colleagues of being "warlords" and unfit for service in the new Afghan government.
"I said there are two kinds of mujahedeen in Afghanistan," Joya told the Associated Press. "One kind fought for independence, which I respect, but the other kind destroyed the country and killed 60,000 people." In response, angered lawmakers shouted death threats and threw empty plastic water bottles at Joya, who was shielded by sympathetic colleagues.

In response to such threats, Joya continues to speak out against those she believes to be former mujahedeen in Afghanistan, stating:

On 21 May 2007, fellow members of the Wolesi Jirga voted to suspend Malalai Joya for three years from the legislature, citing that she had broken Article 70 of the Parliament, which had banned Wolesi Jirga members from openly criticizing each other. Joya had compared the Wolesi Jirga to a "stable or zoo" on a recent TV interview, and later called other members of parliament "criminals" and "drug smugglers." She is reported to have referred to the House as "worse than a stable", since "(a) stable is better, for there you have a donkey that carries a load and a cow that provides the milk."

Joya said the vote was a "political conspiracy" and that she had been told Article 70 was written specifically for her saying "since I've started my struggle for human rights in Afghanistan, for women's rights, these criminals, these drug smugglers, they've stood against me from the first time I raised my voice at the Loya Jirga."

In a statement Brad Adams, Asia director at Human Rights Watch, wrote: "Malalai Joya is a staunch defender of human rights and a powerful voice for Afghan women, and she shouldn't have been suspended from parliament."

People in Farah, Nangarhar, Baghlan, Kabul and some other provinces of Afghanistan staged protests against Joya's suspension.

On 21 June 2007, one month after Joya was suspended, Joya supporters in Melbourne staged protests to the Afghan government to reinstate Joya to the parliament. In November 2007, an international letter was launched with a number of prominent signatories supporting the call for her reinstatement to parliament.

In January 2008, after her suspension, Joya spoke to Rachel Shields and said that the government was not democratically elected and they were "trying to use the country's Islamic law as a tool with which to limit women's rights."

On 18 April 2008, the Governing Council of the Inter-Parliamentary Union, unanimously adopted a resolution at its 182nd session in Cape Town in favour of Malalai Joya which "Calls on the authorities at the same time to do everything in their power to identify and bring to justice those making the death threats against Ms. Joya."

On 7 October 2008, six women Nobel Peace Prize laureates (Shirin Ebadi, Jody Williams, Wangari Maathai, Rigoberta Menchú, Betty Williams and Mairead Maguire) in a joint statement supported Malalai Joya: "We commend this courage, and call for Joya's reinstatement to Afghanistan's national parliament… Like our sister Aung San Suu Kyi, Joya is a model for women everywhere seeking to make the world more just."

During her suspension, Malalai Joya stayed active by giving interviews to western journalists and by writing articles for western newspapers on her views on the situation of Afghanistan. In 2009 she made a tour through the United States and Canada to advocate her cause and to promote her book.

Shukria Barakzai, a fellow MP and women's rights activist, has also criticised the legislature in similar terms: "Our parliament is a collection of lords. Warlords, drug lords, crime lords." She defended Malalai Joya, reporting that some parliamentarians threatened to rape her.

In the mid-night of 10 March 2012, Joya's office in Farah City was stormed by some unknown armed men, in the gun-battle, two of her guards were seriously injured, but as Joya was in Kabul in the time of attack, she was safe.

Announcement of political comeback
In February 2010, at the event of the presentation in Paris of "Au nom de mon peuple", the French publication of her memoir "A Woman Among Warlords", Joya expressed her wish to make a political comeback in the Afghan parliamentary elections scheduled for September. Allegedly, supporters in five Afghan provinces asked her to represent them. These included Nangarhar, Nimroz, Takhar, Kabul and also Farah — the western province that sent her first to the loya jirga that ratified the Constitution, then elected her to Parliament in 2005. Preparing for her comeback, she said she would prefer for security reasons to run as a candidate in the capital.
However, at the occasion of the marriage of one of her body guards in July 2010, she revoked her earlier announcement to participate in the parliamentary elections.

On 21 July 2012: Joya paid a visit to western Afghanistan (Heart and Farah) where she was warmly welcomed by people.

On 21 March 2013 Joya addressed a big Nowruz festival in Khewa district of Nengrahar province in South of Afghanistan. Around 5000 people gathered in this event to celebrate Afghanistan's New Year (1392).

On 24 March 2013 Joya joined the support network in defense of Chelsea Manning. She published a photo holding a sign which read "I am Bradley Manning!" She called her "great anti-war soldiers, who represent the shining face of America."

In 2016, Joya criticized peace talks which saw Gulbuddin Hekmatyar, a long-time Islamist insurgent leader, and his militants pardoned in return for them ending hostilities with the Afghan government. She claimed the agreement "signals more horror and bloodshed" and said that Gulbuddin was a "devious rascal".

In 2017, she stated that things had become worse for activists since the fall of the Taliban regime, claiming "Under the Taliban, we had only one enemy – now we have Taliban, warlords, Islamic State, occupation forces that keep dropping bombs, and the so-called technocrats, who have compromised in exchange for money and power."

Islamic Republic 
After Fall of Kabul to the Taliban on 15 Aug 2021, Joya posted a video shot in burqa from inside a running car in the streets of Kabul on her Facebook page and said that she would continue her fight in Afghanistan. She was later seen in Barcelona, Spain, where she and her family were given political asylum.

Autobiography

Joya wrote a memoir with Canadian writer Derrick O'Keefe. The US and Canadian version of the book was published in October 2009 by Scribner under the title of A Woman Among Warlords: The Extraordinary Story of an Afghan Who Dared to Raise Her Voice in 224 pages. The Australian and British versions have already been published by Pan Macmillan and Rider under the title of Raising My Voice: The Extraordinary Story of an Afghan Who Dares to Speak Out. It has so far been published in German titled Ich erhebe meine Stimme – Eine Frau kämpft gegen den Krieg in Afghanistan, in Norwegian under the title Kvinne blant krigsherrer – Afghanistans modigste stemme and in Dutch under the title Een vrouw tussen krijgsheren and in Japanese under the title Together with Afghan People.

The book will be available, in translation, in France (titled Au nom de mon peuple), Italy, Spain, the Netherlands, Denmark, Indonesia and Israel.

Kirkus Reviews write about Joya's book: "A chilling, vital memoir that reveals hidden truths about Afghanistan and directly addresses the misguided policies of the United States."

Library Journal writes: "This book will interest those who seek stories of real-life heroines risking death every day for their nation."

Publishers Weekly writes: "Joya was outspoken in condemning these warlords she called "criminals" and "antiwomen," enduring the shutting off of her microphone, assassination threats and, finally, suspension from Parliament. Joya is on a dangerous, eye-opening mission to uncover truth and expose the abuse of power in Afghanistan, and her book will work powerfully in her favor."

The New York Times Book Review writes: "(...) bears witness to the horrific experience known as 'being female in Afghanistan'."

Noam Chomsky writes: "Perhaps the most remarkable feature of this inspiring memoir is that despite the horrors she relates, Malalai Joya leaves us with hope that the tormented people of Afghanistan can take their fate into their own hands if they are released from the grip of foreign powers, and that they can reconstruct a decent society from the wreckage left by decades of intervention and the merciless rule of the Taliban and the warlords who the invaders have imposed upon them."

Awards and honors

January 2004, The Cultural Union of Afghans in Europe, awarded her the "Malalai of Maiwand" award for her brave speech in the Loya Jirga.
December 2004, the Valle d'Aosta Province of Italy awarded her the International Women of the Year 2004 Award.
15 March 2006, Tom Bates, Mayor of Berkeley presented a certificate of honor to her for "her continued work on behalf of human rights".
March 2006, she received the 2006 Gwangju Prize for Human Rights from the South Korean May 18th Foundation in South Korea (joint win with Angkhana Neelaphaijit).
Aug.2006, the Women's Peacepower Foundation awarded Joya "Women of Peace award 2006".
She was named among the "1000 Women for the Nobel Peace Prize 2005"
The World Economic Forum selected Joya among 250 Young Global Leaders for 2007.
2007  (Giglio d'Oro) award given by Town Council of Toscana Region of Italy (23 July 2007).
11 September 2007, The European Parliament named Joya among five nominees for Sakharov Prize for Freedom of Thought 2007.
6 October 2007, Commune of Viareggio city of Italy awarded her the Mare Nostrum Award.
9 October 2007, Commune of the Provincia di Arezzo, Comune di Bucine and Comune di Supino in Italy present Honorary citizenships to her.
November 2007, The 14th Angel Award by The Angel Festival, CA, USA.
11 February 2008, Malalai Joya and the documentary "Enemies of Happiness" was honoured with the "International Human Rights Film Award" by Amnesty International, Cinema for Peace and Human Rights Film Network. The award was given to her by two times Academy Award winning actress Hilary Swank.
6 October 2008, Malalai Joya received the Anna Politkovskaya Award in London, which is given to courageous women who have defended human rights.
21 October 2008, Regional Council of Tuscany (Italy) presented Malalai Joya a Gold Medal.
30 October 2008, Spanish organization, Spanish Committee for the Assistance to the Refugees (CEAR), announce Malalai Joya and Kurdish activist Leyla Zana winner of 2008 Juan Maria Bandres award for Human Rights and solidarity with the refugees.
28 March 2009, International Anti-discrimination Award 2009 by Dutch Unity is Strength Foundation, Rotterdam, The Netherlands.
8 November 2009, US Member of Congress Barbara Lee Honors Malalai Joya.
29 April 2010, named to the 2010 TIME 100, the magazine's annual list of the 100 most influential people in the world. although she is angry at how she was portrayed as in favor of the NATO and U.S. occupation.
23 June 2010, Spanish daily El Mundo awards Yo Dona International award of "premio a la Labor Humanitaria" to Malalai in Madrid.
27 September 2010, British Magazine New Statesman listed Malalai Joya in the list of "The World's 50 Most Influential Figures 2010".
10 October 2010, Italian Swiss University of Peace gave its International Award "Donna dell'Anno 2010" (woman of the year 2010) to Malalai Joya.
4 November 2010, As part of the Forbes The World's Most Powerful People package, American playwright, performer and activist Eve Ensler, founder of V-Day, named The World's Seven Most Powerful Feminists, Malalai Joya was one of them.
28 November 2010, Foreign Policy Magazine listed Malalai Joya in its annual list of the Top 100 Global Thinkers.
8 March 2011, The Guardian listed her among "Top 100 women: activists and campaigners".
18 November 2021, In the Simply Woman International Award Malalai Joya Awarded as a "Woman for Peace".

Books
Malalai Joya's life and political activity have inspired an adventure novel by Thomas Pistoia published in Italy, La leggenda del Burqa.

Films
Malalai Joya champions rape victims, 2008, by Glyn Strong.
Enemies of Happiness, 2006, directed by Eva Mulvad.
A Woman Among Warlords (2007). Directed by Eva Mulvad. Aired on the Wide Angle TV series in September 2007.
Afghanistan Unveiled 2004, by Nicolas Delloye, Aina Productions
Malalai Joya (Samia's Wedding)]', August 2010, by Glyn Strong

References

External links

Defense Committee for Malalai Joya
The Afghan Women's Mission
Malalai Joya on HARDtalk program of BBC – BBC News, 21 May 2009
Video of CNN interview with Malalai Joya
Column archive at The Guardian''

Afghan feminists
21st-century Afghan women politicians
21st-century Afghan politicians
1978 births
Living people
Members of the House of the People (Afghanistan)
People from Farah Province
Afghan women writers
Afghan writers
Afghan activists
Afghan women activists
21st-century Afghan women writers